Sequin may refer to:

 Sequin, a disk shaped bead
 Sequin (coin)
 Séquin, a family name
 Sequins (film), a 2004 French film titled Brodeuses in France
 Sequin and Knobel Swiss architects active in 1907.